The Wedding Ring is a 1971 French mystery film directed by Christian de Chalonge and starring Anna Karina.

Cast
 Anna Karina as Jeanne
 Jean-Claude Carrière as Hugues
 Isabelle Sadoyan as Hélène
 Tsilla Chelton as Madame Duvernet
 Paule Emanuele as Madame Sedaine
 André Gille as Monsieur Sedaine
 Rufus as The pigeons' breeder
 Jean Wiener
 Pierre Risch
 Pierre Julien
 Georges Poichet
 Pascal Korner
 Jean-Claude de Goros
 Antonio Pérez

References

External links

1971 films
1970s mystery films
French mystery films
1970s French-language films
Films directed by Christian de Chalonge
Films with screenplays by Jean-Claude Carrière
1970s French films